Thrill Seeker is the debut studio album by American metalcore band August Burns Red. It was released on November 8, 2005, through Solid State Records and was produced by Adam Dutkiewicz. A music video was released for the opening track "Your Little Suburbia Is In Ruins".

Thrill Seeker is the band's only release to feature both original bassist Jordan Tuscan and vocalist Josh McManness, as they both would later depart from the band the following year with Dustin Davidson and Jake Luhrs taking their positions respectively. An unreleased track, "Pride & Humility", was featured on This is Solid State Vol. 6.

In 2020, the band celebrated the album's 15th anniversary with a virtual livestream concert, with no fans in attendance due to the COVID-19 pandemic. They performed the album in its entirety, featuring a guest appearance from McManness, performing lead vocals on "Consumer", followed by an encore of songs from Messengers. This performance was later made available to stream as an album.

Track listing

Personnel
August Burns Red
 Josh McManness – lead vocals
 JB Brubaker – lead guitar
 Brent Rambler – rhythm guitar
 Jordan Tuscan – bass guitar
 Matt Greiner – drums, piano

Additional personnel
 Adam Dutkiewicz – producer, engineering, mixing
 Wayne Krupa – engineering
 Troy Glessner – mastering
 Asterik Studio, Seattle, Washington – art direction, design 
 Dave Hill – band photography

References

External links 
Thrill Seeker at Allmusic
 Pride & Humility track

August Burns Red albums
2005 debut albums
Solid State Records albums
Albums produced by Adam Dutkiewicz